Los hombres también lloran, is a Colombian telenovela produced by Alessandro Angulo for Caracol Televisión. It is based on the Argentinian film No sos vos, soy yo produced in 2004. The telenovela premiered on April 21, 2015 on Venevisión, was first aired in Venezuela then in Colombia.

Plot 
Los hombres también lloran tells the story of Javier, a man who thought he had everything in life: being a recognized doctor who is within days of receiving his desired promotion and being married to a beautiful woman. Thrilled with their new income, the couple buys an expensive apartment, and Maria gets excited over their more luxurious lifestyle. However, their dreams of the good life are dashed. When his office is assigned to another doctor, it causes the collapse of Javier and Maria's world. They decide to start a new life in Miami. She travels first, while he stays to sell everything. The day comes for Javier to travel to Miami when he gets a call from Maria saying "Javier, don't come!".

Cast 
Guillermo García as Javier Torres
Carolina Gómez as María Sáenz
Florina Lemaitre as Estela
Mónica Lopera as Julia Vanegas
Andrés Castañeda as Luis Gómez
Constanza Duque as Lina
Carlos Vives as José
Marcela Benjumea as Gloria Mercedes
Jairo Camargo as Eugenio
Cecilia Navia as Laura Rodríguez
Juan Pablo Escobar as Gabriel Méndez
Marcelo Dos Santos as Dr Vicente Domínguez
Kimberly Reyes as Kimberly
Julio Pachón as Christian de Mar
Christian Tappan as Edgard
Rodrigo Candamil as Federico Ramos
Humberto Dorado as Horacio Gómez
Tiberio Cruz as Edwin Selecta
Luz Estrada as Romina
Fabio Rubiano as "Detective Carlos Rojas"
Santiago Alarcón as Pablo Herrera
José Restrepo as Socrates Martín
Fernando Arévalo as Rafael López

References

External links 

2015 telenovelas
Colombian telenovelas
Caracol Televisión telenovelas
Spanish-language telenovelas
2015 Colombian television series debuts
2015 Colombian television series endings
Television shows set in Bogotá